is a Japanese short anime series airing on TV consisting of 12, 30-second long episodes airing from April 3 to June 19, 2016. It is based on the video game of the same name released on December 15, 2016 in Japan for iOS, Android, PC; and ended its service on December 31, 2017.

Plot
The year is 2035 E.R.  Giant living creatures called Fiarem have suddenly appeared on Earth.

In order to overcome this situation, the Japanese Diet makes the decision to use Cell Growth Factor CGF-3 technology, which enlarges living beings, for military motives and send humans into battle as giant weapons.

Six heroines are selected as appropriate subjects for enlargement, and enter the Anti-Fiarem Specialists Unit, Ragna Strikers. These young women, trusting their bonds with the secret government agency, head into battle with their powerful enemies.

Characters

Heroines

Free-spirited and skilled at being spoiled. Her fault is that she's a shut-in who loves her house so much that she never wants to go outside. She has a strong sense of justice and decided to fight the Fiarem to protect the world.

Her main weapon is a blaster rifle.

Pure and innocent, she's the team mascot and is loved by everyone in the team like a younger sister. She's aiming to become an idol and never misses a lesson. A cosplay maniac.

Her main weapon are a set of gloves.

She may look cold but really she's a pure and innocent girl, and a late bloomer when it comes to romance. Everything she knows about love comes from books and dramas, so whenever she's alone with a guy she freaks out and ends up acting audaciously. A genius with an IQ of 200.

Her main weapon is a cannon.

The only daughter of the famous Kanomiya family. Her actions are that of a noble lady and she thinks she always has to be the best at everything. Brimming with curiosity and able to quickly take action, she's also fascinated by the commoners' way of life.

Her main weapon is a sword.

A ball of sunshine, calm and kind to anyone and everyone. She's skilled at a variety of household tasks, but she's always worrying the other members with her unique creative cuisine.

Her main weapons are a bow and arrows.

A former member of the military who applied to be part of the enlargement experiment but for some reason it failed and turned her into a fourteen year old girl. She hates being treated as a younger person and she frequently gets angry. Her sense of responsibility and justice is stronger than others, and she gets angry at her fellow members' slovenliness.

Her main weapon is a giant hammer.

Commanders

The commander of the Ragna Strikers.

Rio's aide, she is sloppy at her job and has a drinking problem. She is a caring person and is endeared to everyone like an older sister whom they can consult.

Development
The series was made by Satelight, and was produced by Aniplex and Dingo Inc. as the original creators and DMM as distributor of the game. Voice actress Tomoyo Kurosawa as protagonist Ayano Anemori sings the theme song .

Media

Anime
The anime was directed by Junichi Wada whilst the script was written by Takeshi Kikuchi with character designs by Tōru Imanishi.

Episode list

Video game
The anime is based on a 3D real-time battle action game of the same name for iOS, Android, and PC. Players assumes the role of the "Spec Ops Officer" of the girls' Ragnastrikers unit to fight the mysterious enemy Fiarem. The game was launched on December 15, 2016 as a Japan exclusive. On December 31, 2017. Ragnastrike Angels officially terminated its service.

References

External links 
Official website (archived) 

2016 anime television series debuts
2016 video games
Action video games
Anime television series based on video games
Aniplex franchises
Fiction about size change
Satelight